The Neue Juristische Wochenschrift (NJW) (German: New Legal Weekly Journal) is a German legal magazine. It is published weekly by C. H. Beck in a run of 42.836 copies. It was founded in 1946 and counts as one of the two most important German legal magazines.

References

1946 establishments in Germany
German-language magazines
Weekly magazines published in Germany
Legal magazines
Magazines established in 1946
Mass media in Frankfurt
German law journals